Harry Fischel House, also known as Fairlawn, is a historic home located at Hunter in Greene County, New York.  It was built about 1840 and substantially enlarged in 1904.  It is a -story, five-by-two-bay, Queen Anne–style dwelling with a 2-story, eight-by-one-bay rear wing.  It features a 2-story, engaged corner tower and single-story verandah.

It was listed on the National Register of Historic Places in 2000.

References

Houses on the National Register of Historic Places in New York (state)
Queen Anne architecture in New York (state)
Houses completed in 1840
Houses in Greene County, New York
National Register of Historic Places in Greene County, New York